"Someday" is a song by Julian Lennon, released exclusively on iTunes on 8 April 2013, Lennon's birthday. The track was added to the 2013 re-release of 2011's Everything Changes. The song includes lyrics from The Beatles' "Baby, You're a Rich Man".

History
Lennon said in early June that he was going to be writing with Steven Tyler. A few days after that statement Lennon said that he was recording "Someday", which was "written the previous Friday". In a Facebook post date July 2012, Lennon said that mixing for the song, and another song "In Between", was completed.

"Someday" performed by

 Vocals: Julian Lennon & Steven Tyler
 Backing Vocals: Julian Lennon, Steven Tyler & Mark Spiro
 Mark Spiro - Acoustic guitar
 Steve Sidelnyk - Drum, percussion programming
 Jon MacLennan - Electric guitar 

 Steve Sidewell - String arrangements
 Vanessa Fraebairn-Smith  - Cello
 Tereza Stanislave - Violin
 Alwyn Wright -  Violin
 Rob Brophy - Viola

References

External links
Official music video for "Someday" at YouTube

Julian Lennon songs
Songs written by Julian Lennon
Songs written by Mark Spiro
Songs written by Steven Tyler
2012 songs